The Netherlands participated in the Eurovision Song Contest 2003 with the song "One More Night" written by Tjeerd van Zanen and Alan Michael. The song was performed by Esther Hart. The Dutch broadcaster Nederlandse Omroep Stichting (NOS) returned to the Eurovision Song Contest after a one-year absence following their withdrawal in 2002 as one of the bottom six countries in the 2001 contest. NOS organised the national final Nationaal Songfestival 2003 in collaboration with broadcaster Televisie Radio Omroep Stichting (TROS) in order to select the Dutch entry for the 2003 contest in Riga, Latvia. 32 entries competed in the national final which consisted of five shows: four semi-finals and a final. Eight entries qualified from to compete in the final on 1 March 2003 where "One More Night" performed by Esther Hart was selected as the winner following the combination of votes from a seven-member jury panel and a public vote.

The Netherlands competed in the Eurovision Song Contest which took place on 24 May 2003. Performing during the show in position 14, the Netherlands placed thirteenth out of the 26 participating countries, scoring 45 points.

Background 

The Dutch least successful result has been last place, which they have achieved on four occasions, most recently in the 1968 contest.

The Dutch national broadcaster, Nederlandse Omroep Stichting (NOS), broadcast the event within the Netherlands and organises the selection process for the nation's entry. The Netherlands has used various methods to select the Dutch entry in the past, such as the Nationaal Songfestival, a live televised national final to choose the performer, song or both to compete at Eurovision. However, internal selections have also been held on occasion. Between 1998 and 2001, NOS has organised Nationaal Songfestival in order to select both the artist and song for the contest. The method was continued for the 2003 Dutch entry, with the national final being organised in collaboration with broadcaster Televisie Radio Omroep Stichting (TROS).

Before Eurovision

Nationaal Songfestival 2003 
Nationaal Songfestival 2003 was the national final developed by NOS/TROS that selected the Dutch entry for the Eurovision Song Contest 2003. Thirty-two entries competed in the competition consisting of five shows that commenced with the first of four semi-finals on 1 February 2003 and concluded with a final on 1 March 2003. All shows in the competition were broadcast on Nederland 2.

Format 
The format of the national final consisted of five shows: four semi-finals and a final. The semi-finals each featured eight competing entries from which two advanced from each show to complete the eight-song lineup in the final. The results for the semi-final shows were determined by a seven-member expert jury and votes from the public. The jury selected one qualifier, while a public televote determined an additional qualifier from the remaining entries. In the final, the winner was selected by the combination of votes from public televoting and a seven-member expert jury. Viewers were able to vote via telephone and SMS.

The jury panel that voted in all shows consisted of:

 Cornald Maas – journalist
 Corry Brokken – singer and television presenter, Dutch 1957 Eurovision winner as well as 1956 and 1958 entrant
 Seth Kamphuijs – actor and presenter
 Coot van Doesburg – lyricist and television critic
 Johan Nijenhuis – director and producer
 Nance Coolen – singer and television presenter
 Stanley Burleson – actor, choreographer, director and singer

Competing entries 
The Dutch broadcaster together with Conamus directly invited over 1,000 composers to submit entries. 502 submissions were received by the broadcaster at the closing of the deadline, and the thirty-two selected competing entries were announced during a press conference on 16 January 2003. The selection of the entries for the competition occurred through the decision by a selection commission consisting of Willem van Beusekom, Jerney Kaagman, Ron Stoeltie, Daniël Dekker and Daan van Rijsbergen following a live audition of 60 shortlisted entries. Among the artists was Ingrid Simons (as part of Ebonique) who previously represented Belgium at the Eurovision Song Contest 2002 as part of Sergio and the Ladies.

Shows

Semi-finals 
The four semi-finals took place on 1, 8, 15 and 22 February 2003 at the Hart van Holland in Nijkerk, hosted by Harm Edens. In each semi-final eight acts competed and two entries qualified to the final. A seven-member expert jury first selected one entry to advance, while an additional qualifier was selected by a public televote. 2001 Dutch Eurovision entrant Michelle replaced Coot van Doesburg as a juror in the third semi-final, while 1999 Dutch Eurovision entrant Marlayne replaced Johan Nijenhuis as a juror in the fourth semi-final.

Final
The final took place on 1 March 2003 at the Rotterdam Ahoy in Rotterdam, hosted by Loes Luca where the eight entries that qualified from the preceding four semi-finals competed. The winner, "One More Night" performed by Esther Hart, was selected by the 50/50 combination of a public televote and the votes of a seven-member expert jury. 1998 Dutch Eurovision entrant Edsilia Rombley replaced Nance Coolen as a juror in the final. The viewers and the juries each had a total of 280 points to award. Each juror distributed their points as follows: 1, 2, 3, 5, 7, 10 and 12 points. The viewer vote was based on the percentage of votes each song achieved through the following voting methods: telephone and SMS voting. For example, if a song gained 10% of the vote, then that entry would be awarded 10% of 280 points rounded to the nearest integer: 28 points. 55,000 votes were cast by the public during the final. In addition to the performances of the competing entries, the show featured performances by Loes Luca as Nénette together with Les Zézettes and the Metropole Orchestra.

On the day after the contest, a technical problem came to light whereby the 30,000 SMS votes could not be counted on time. A revision of the results revealed that Bert Heerink and Manou would have placed fifth, with Mango Nuts and Mary Amora correspondingly dropping a place.

Ratings

At Eurovision 
According to Eurovision rules, all nations with the exceptions of the bottom five countries in the 2002 contest competed in the final on 24 May 2003. On 29 November 2002, a special allocation draw was held which determined the running order and the Netherlands was set to perform in position 14, following the entry from Israel and before the entry from the United Kingdom. The Netherlands finished in thirteenth place with 14 points.

The show was broadcast in the Netherlands on Nederland 1 with commentary by Willem van Beusekom as well as via radio on Radio 3FM with commentary by Wessel van Diepen. The Dutch spokesperson, who announced the Dutch votes during the show, was 1999 Dutch Eurovision entrant Marlayne.

Voting 
Below is a breakdown of points awarded to the Netherlands and awarded by the Netherlands in the contest. The nation awarded its 12 points to Turkey in the contest.

References 

2003
Countries in the Eurovision Song Contest 2003
Eurovision